Cry Tuff Dub Encounter Chapter 1 is a 1978 dub album by Prince Far I, which was credited on its release to his backing band The Arabs. It was produced by Prince Far I, engineered by Dennis Bovell and Mark Lusardi, and mixed by Adrian Sherwood.

The album saw its first CD release in 1991 by Danceteria as part of their "ROIR Sessions" series. It was subsequently reissued on CD in 1997 by Pressure Sounds.

Track listing 

 "A Message"
 "The Visitor"
 "The Right Way"
 "Long Life"
 "The Encounter"
 "Ghardaia Dub"
 "Mansion of the Almighty"
 "Mozabites"
 "Prince of Peace"
 "Abderrahane"

Personnel 
 Prince Far I - vocals
The Arabs
 Eric "Fish" Clarke - drums
 Sly Dunbar - drums
 Clinton Jack - bass guitar
 Flabba Holt - bass guitar, guitar
 Bingy Bunny - guitar
 Antonio "Crucial Tony" Phillips - guitar
 Noel "Sowell" Bailey - guitar
 Chinna - guitar
 Theo Beckford - piano
 Clifton "Bigga" Morrison - piano
 Creation Rebel - percussion
 Sucker - percussion
 Sticky - percussion

References 

Prince Far I albums
1978 albums
Dub albums